Eugenia jutiapensis is a species of plant in the family Myrtaceae. It is found in El Salvador and Guatemala. It is threatened by habitat loss.

References

jutiapensis
Data deficient plants
Flora of El Salvador
Flora of Guatemala
Taxonomy articles created by Polbot